Nattachak Hanjitkasen (born 1 June 1992) is a Thai racing driver currently competing in the TCR International Series and TCR Thailand Touring Car Championship. Having previously competed in the Thailand Super Series and TCR Asia Series.

Racing career
Hanjitkasen began his career in 2015 in the Thailand Super Series, he finished sixth in the S2000 class standings that year. For 2016 he switched to the all new 2016 TCR Thailand Touring Car Championship, where he also took part in the 2016 TCR Asia Series round held in Thailand.

In August 2016 it was announced that he would race in the TCR International Series, driving a Honda Civic TCR for TBN MK Ihere Racing Team.

Racing record

Complete TCR International Series results
(key) (Races in bold indicate pole position) (Races in italics indicate fastest lap)

† Driver did not finish the race, but was classified as he completed over 90% of the race distance.
* Season still in progress.

References

External links
 

1992 births
Living people
TCR Asia Series drivers
TCR International Series drivers
Nattachak Hanjitkasen